Ragan Elizabeth Smith (born August 8, 2000) is an American collegiate gymnast. She is a five-time member of the US National Team (2014–2019). She is the 2017 United States national all-around champion and was an alternate for the 2016 Olympic team.

Personal life 
Smith was born in Snellville, Georgia, to Michael and Kerry Smith. She has two younger brothers. Her mother was a gymnastics coach. Smith began gymnastics in 2004. Smith lived in Lewisville, Texas for six years, and she currently lives in Norman, Oklahoma.

Junior career

2013 
Smith qualified for Junior International Elite status in 2013 and advanced to the 2013 Secret U.S. Classic in Hoffman Estates, Illinois. She placed 23rd in the all-around and advanced to U.S. Nationals later in the month, where she finished 17th all-around.

2014 
Smith attended her first international assignment in March 2014, after her addition to the U.S. National Team, at the 2014 City of Jesolo Trophy in Venice, Italy. She contributed an all-around score of 52.650.  In August 2014, Smith competed at the 2014 Secret U.S. Classic and scored 54.450, finishing thirteenth in the all-around and first on floor, advancing to the U.S. Nationals, where she placed seventh in the all-around with a two-day combined total of 110.750 and second on beam and floor with scores of 29.000 and 29.150, respectively.

2015 
In March, Smith once again attended the City of Jesolo Trophy. In qualifications, which also served as an all-around/team final, Smith placed 5th with a score of 56.100 and made both the vault and floor finals. She scored a 14.350 on vault, earning a third-place finish, and 14.250 on floor, placing second.

Smith competed in the Secret U.S. Classic, placing 1st on the floor exercise, as well as 2nd in the all-around and 3rd on vault. In August, Smith attended the 2015 US Nationals. She came in 3rd all-around with a two-day combined score of 116.450 and won both balance beam and floor. On December 19, 2015, Smith committed to the University of Oklahoma and the Sooners program.

Senior career

2016 
Smith's senior debut came at the 2016 City of Jesolo Trophy in March, where she finished second on beam, floor, and the all-around. In April, she competed at the Pacific Rim Championships, winning balance beam with a score of 15.225. At the Secret U.S. Classic, Smith finished fifth on beam and tied for sixth on bars.  At the U.S. Olympic Trials in San Jose on July 10, 2016, she scored 15.3 on the balance beam and finished second on the event. On July 10, Smith was named as an alternate to the 2016 Olympic team, alongside Ashton Locklear and MyKayla Skinner.

2017 
On March 4, Smith won the gold medal ahead of Japanese Olympian Asuka Teramoto at the American Cup in Newark, New Jersey. In July Smith competed at the U.S. Classic on uneven bars and balance beam only. She took first place on both events.

On August 20, Smith won the 2017 U.S. National Gymnastics Championships all-around title with a two-day combined score of 115.250, over three points ahead of silver medalist Jordan Chiles. She also placed first on floor exercise ahead of Jade Carey and Trinity Thomas, first on balance beam ahead of Riley McCusker and Thomas, and third on uneven bars behind McCusker and Locklear. She was named to the national team for the fourth consecutive year.

On September 20, Smith was selected to represent the United States at the 2017 Artistic Gymnastics World Championships in Montreal alongside Carey, Locklear, and Morgan Hurd. During qualifications Smith qualified to the all-around final in second place behind Mai Murakami of Japan despite an uncharacteristic fall on the balance beam. Smith also qualified to the floor exercise final in first with a score of 14.433, ahead of Murakami and teammate Carey. She was arguably the favorite to win the all-around title, but minutes before her first rotation on vault she injured her ankle during warmups and withdrew from the all-around final. This was only one of many injuries sustained by major contenders over the course of the championships, with Kohei Uchimura of Japan, Rebeca Andrade of Brazil and Larisa Iordache of Romania all withdrawing from the competition due to injury. Oksana Chusovitina of Uzbekistan, the athlete representative,  mentioned that the new podium training format only allowed the gymnasts a few minutes on each piece, not giving the gymnasts a sufficient amount of time to get used to the equipment, and suggested this as a reason for a much larger number of mistakes and injuries than usual. Smith's injury also forced her to withdraw from the floor exercise event final. Smith's recovery included extensive physical therapy and rehab as she chose to avoid the risks of surgery.

2018
In her comeback meet, Smith competed at the City of Jesolo Trophy in April. The US did not field a team, but Smith and club teammate Emma Malabuyo competed as individuals. Smith won silver in the all-around, balance beam, and uneven bars. She competed at the 2018 U.S. Classic in late July. She only competed on vault, balance beam, and uneven bars. She finished third on balance beam.

Marred by lingering torn ligaments in her ankle, broken toes, and mental struggles at the 2018 U.S Championships in August, Smith finished 10th in the all-around, 8th on vault, 8th on beam, tied for 11th on bars, and 11th on floor over the cumulative two day competition. She was not selected for the eight member national team for 2018.

In October Smith participated in the Worlds Team Selection Camp. During the competition she placed fifth in the all-around, third on balance beam behind Kara Eaker and Riley McCusker, fourth on vault and floor exercise, and eighth on uneven bars. The following day she was named to the team to compete at the 2018 World Championships alongside Biles, Morgan Hurd, McCusker, Grace McCallum, and Eaker.  As a result of making the World Championship team, Smith was added back onto the National Team. While in Doha she was chosen as the alternate.  Although she did not compete at the World Championships, she still earned a gold medal alongside her teammates.

In December Smith officially signed with the Oklahoma Sooners women's gymnastics program, starting in the 2020–21 season.

2019
In 2019, Smith attended the U.S. Women's National Team camps in January, February, and May but was noticeably absent from the June camp, despite all other National Team members being in attendance, sparking rumors that she was going to attend the University of Oklahoma in the fall.  In July, Smith confirmed on Instagram that she had decided to join the Oklahoma Sooners for the 2019–2020 season, presumably ending her elite career as she was not on the roster to compete at the upcoming U.S. Classic.

NCAA career

2019–2020 season 
In July, Smith announced that she would be joining the Oklahoma Sooners women's gymnastics team for the 2019–2020 season, instead of deferring for a year like she had originally planned.  She made her NCAA debut at the Collegiate Challenge where she competed the all-around and helped Oklahoma finish first, recording the highest score on balance beam for her team.

2021–2022 season 
Smith competed on January 9 in a meet against Alabama.  She competed on uneven bars, balance beam, and floor exercise, helping Oklahoma win the meet.  On February 6, in a meet against Texas Women's University, Smith earned her first collegiate perfect ten on the balance beam.

Career perfect 10.0

Selected competitive skills

Competitive history

References

External links 
 
 

2000 births
American female artistic gymnasts
Gymnasts from Texas
Living people
Oklahoma Sooners women's gymnasts
People from Snellville, Georgia
U.S. women's national team gymnasts
NCAA gymnasts who have scored a perfect 10
Sportspeople from the Atlanta metropolitan area